This is a list of all extant genera, species and subspecies of the snakes of the subfamily Erycinae, otherwise referred to as erycines or Old World sand boas. It follows the taxonomy currently provided by ITIS, which is based on the continuing work of Roy McDiarmid.
 Charina, rubber boas
 Charina bottae, northern rubber boa or coastal rubber boa
 Charina umbratica, southern rubber boa 
 Eryx, Old World sand boas
 Eryx borrii, Borri's sand boa
 Eryx colubrinus, Egyptian sand boa or Kenyan sand boa
 Eryx colubrinus colubrinus
 Eryx colubrinus loveridgei
 Eryx colubrinus rufescens
 Eryx conicus, Russell's boa, rough-scaled sand boa or rough-tailed sand boa
 Eryx elegans, Central Asian sand boa
 Eryx jaculus, javelin sand boa
 Eryx jayakari, Arabian sand boa or Jayakar's sand boa
 Eryx johnii, Indian sand boa
 Eryx miliaris, dwarf sand boa, desert sand boa or Tartar sand boa
 Eryx muelleri, Müller's sand boa or Sahara sand boa
 Eryx muelleri muelleri
 Eryx muelleri subniger
 Eryx sistanensis, Sistan sand boa
 Eryx somalicus, Somali sand boa
 Eryx vittatus
 Eryx whitakeri, Whitaker's sand boa or Whitaker's boa
 Lichanura, rosy boas
 Lichanura orcutti, coastal rosy boa
 Lichanura trivirgata, desert rosy boa
 Lichanura trivirgata arizonae, Arizona rosy boa
 Lichanura trivirgata gracia, desert rosy boa
 Lichanura trivirgata saslowi, Baja rosy boa
 Lichanura trivirgata trivirgata, Mexican rosy boa

See also
 List of boine species and subspecies

References

 
Erycinae
Erycinae